Asim Munir Butt (born 24 October 1982) he's belong to afridi family is a former Pakistani cricketer. Munir was a right-handed batsman who bowled right-arm off break. He was born in Sialkot, Punjab.

Munir made his debut for Gujranwala in a List A match in the 1998/99 Pakistani cricket season against Lahore City. The following season, he made his first-class debut for the team against Pakistan International Airlines. He played first-class and List A cricket for the team until the 2002/03 season, Butt also played first-class and List A cricket for Sui Northern Gas Pipelines Limited, who he represented from the 2001/02 season to the 2003/04 season. He additionally played List A cricket for the Pakistan Cricket Board Blues and Pakistan Emerging Players, who he played for in 2002/03 and 2003/04 respectively. He played county cricket in England on a single occasion, playing a List A match for Cumberland against Devon in the 2nd round of the 2003 Cheltenham & Gloucester Trophy, which was played in 2002.

Overall, Munir played 23 first-class matches. In these, he scored 1,322 runs at a batting average of 42.64, making 4 half centuries and 4 centuries. His highest score, an unbeaten 157, came against the Rest of Baluchistan in 2001/02. He took 3 wickets with the ball, coming at a bowling average of 53.66. In List A matches, he made 41 appearances. In these, he scored 953 runs at an average of 26.47, making 4 half centuries and 2 centuries. His highest score, an unbeaten 128, came against Multan in 2002/03. He took a total of 8 wickets with the ball, at an average of 29.50 and with best figures of 4/44.

Munir also played a number of Youth One Day Internationals for Pakistan Under-19s, making his debut against Sri Lanka Under-19s in 2001. He also played for Pakistan Under-19s in the 2002 Under-19 World Cup.

References

External links
Asim Munir at ESPNcricinfo
Asim Munir at CricketArchive

1982 births
Living people
Cricketers from Sialkot
Pakistani cricketers
Gujranwala cricketers
Sui Northern Gas Pipelines Limited cricketers
Cumberland cricketers
Cambridgeshire cricketers